The Fencing competition at the 2010 Central American and Caribbean Games was being held in Mayagüez, Puerto Rico.

The tournament was scheduled to be held from 18–23 July at the Coliseo Rebekah Colberg Cabrera in Porta del Sol.

Medal summary

Men's events

Women's events

External links

Events at the 2010 Central American and Caribbean Games
2010 in fencing
2010
Fencing competitions in Puerto Rico